Elections to Fermanagh District Council were held on 30 May 1973 on the same day as the other Northern Irish local government elections. The election used five district electoral areas to elect a total of 20 councillors.

Election results

Districts summary

|- class="unsortable" align="centre"
!rowspan=2 align="left"|Ward
! % 
!Cllrs
! % 
!Cllrs
! %
!Cllrs
! %
!Cllrs
!rowspan=2|TotalCllrs
|- class="unsortable" align="center"
!colspan=2 bgcolor="" | UUP
!colspan=2 bgcolor="" | Unity
!colspan=2 bgcolor="" | SDLP
!colspan=2 bgcolor="white"| Others
|-
|align="left"|Area A
|0.0
|0
|bgcolor=olive|33.5
|bgcolor=olive|2
|0.0
|0
|66.5
|2
|4
|-
|align="left"|Area B
|bgcolor="40BFF5"|56.4
|bgcolor="40BFF5"|2
|33.2
|1
|0.0
|0
|10.4
|0
|4
|-
|align="left"|Area C
|33.7
|2
|bgcolor=olive|35.4
|bgcolor=olive|1
|0.0
|0
|30.9
|1
|4
|-
|align="left"|Area D
|bgcolor="40BFF5"|38.9
|bgcolor="40BFF5"|2
|6.9
|0
|31.3
|2
|22.9
|0
|4
|-
|align="left"|Area E
|13.3
|1
|11.6
|0
|bgcolor="#99FF66"|28.3
|bgcolor="#99FF66"|2
|46.8
|1
|5
|- class="unsortable" class="sortbottom" style="background:#C9C9C9"
|align="left"| Total
|28.2
|8
|24.3
|4
|11.9
|4
|35.6
|4
|20
|-
|}

Districts results

Area A

1973: 2 x Unity, 1 x Independent Unionist, 1 x Independent Nationalist

Area B

1973: 3 x UUP, 1 x Unity

Area C

1973: 2 x UUP, 1 x Unity, 1 x Independent Nationalist

Area D

1973: 2 x SDLP, 2 x UUP

Area E

1973: 2 x SDLP, 1 x UUP, 1 x Independent Unionist

References

1973 Northern Ireland local elections
20th century in County Fermanagh
Fermanagh District Council elections